The Battle of Santa Rita de Morelos or Battle of Morelos (24-25 March1840) was between insurgents under the command of General Antonio Canales fighting for the Republic of the Rio Grande and the Centralists under the command of General Mariano Arista fighting for the First Mexican Republic. The result was a victory for the Centralists.

Battle
The respective armies of the insurgents met at Morelos, Coahuila on the 24-25 March 1840. The Centralist Mexican forces defeated the insurgent forces. Included in this defeat was the trial and execution of 23 members of the insurgents' cavalry, including Colonel Jose Antonio de Zapata, the commander of the cavalry, on the 29 March.

Aftermath
General Canales and the remaining insurgents that survived the Battle of Morelos sought refuge in San Antonio, Texas. Later that year Canales organized an expedition back into Mexico, but the vanguard under the command of Samuel Jordan met with defeat at the hands of a Centralist force under General Rafael Vasquez near Saltillo. Jordan and his command retreated back into Texas and soon afterwards Canales capitulated to the Centralists.

Notes

References
 
 .

Further reading

1840 in Mexico
Santa Rita de Morelos
Republic of the Rio Grande